Lonicera japonica, known as Japanese honeysuckle and golden-and-silver honeysuckle, is a species of honeysuckle native to eastern Asia. It is often grown as an ornamental plant, but has become an invasive species in a number of countries. Japanese honeysuckle is used in traditional Chinese medicine.

Description
When its stems are young, they are slightly red in color and may be fuzzy. Older stems are brown with peeling bark, and are often hollow on the inside. The flowers are double-tongued, opening white and fading to yellow, and sweetly vanilla scented. The fruit, which is produced in fall, is a black spherical berry  diameter containing a few seeds. While the nectar from the flowers can be safely consumed by humans, all other parts of the plant have the potential to be toxic.

Subspecies
There are three subspecies of Lonicera japonica:

Cultivation, management, and uses
Even though it is a highly invasive and destructive plant, this species is often sold by American nurseries as the cultivar 'Hall's Prolific' (Lonicera japonica var. halliana), and in the UK as the cultivar 'Halliana'. The cultivar is also known as Hall's Japanese honeysuckle. It is an effective groundcover and has strong-smelling flowers. It can be cultivated by seed, cuttings, or layering. In addition, it will spread itself via shoots if given enough space to grow. The variety L. japonica var. repens has gained the Royal Horticultural Society's Award of Garden Merit.

Japanese honeysuckle flowers are edible to humans and appreciated for their sweet-tasting nectar. The flowers can also be a significant source of food for deer, rabbits, hummingbirds, and other wildlife.

Herbal medicine
In traditional Chinese medicine,  Lonicera japonica is called rěn dōng téng; literally "winter enduring vine") or jīn yín huā (literally "gold-silver flower," in reference to the presence of flowers of different age on the same plant as each flower change from white (silver) to yellow (gold)). Alternative Chinese names include er hua (二花) and shuang hua (雙花), meaning double-[color] flowers. 

The dried leaves and flowers (Flos Lonicerae Japonicae) are employed in traditional Chinese medicine, where they are believed to be of use to treat fever, cold-related headache, cough, thirst, certain inflammation including sore throat, skin infection, and tumor necrosis.

Antiviral action
The antiviral action of loniflavone, a compound found in Lonicera japonica,  has been investigated in computational studies, in which the ability of this compound to bind with high affinity to the spike protein of SARS-CoV-2 has been demonstrated, an early step towards drug development for the disease caused by that virus.

As an invasive species
Japanese honeysuckle has become naturalized in Argentina, Australia, Brazil, Mexico, New Zealand, and much of the US, including Hawaii, as well as a number of Pacific and Caribbean islands. It is classified as a noxious weed in Texas, Illinois, and Virginia, and is banned in Indiana and New Hampshire. It is listed on the New Zealand National Pest Plant Accord as an unwanted organism.

Lonicera japonica was initially brought to the United States from Japan in the early 1900s as an ornamental plant. It is still deliberately planted in the United States for reasons such as erosion control or forage for deer, but has become invasive in many areas. It prefers to invade areas that have been disturbed, such as roadsides or floodplains. It will generally only invade forests when the canopy has been opened by logging or fallen trees, as it grows less vigorously in the shade. Once it has invaded an area, Lonicera japonica grows rapidly and outcompetes native plants for sunlight and nutrients. It proliferates using both sexual and vegetative reproduction, producing seeds that are spread by animals and expanding locally via rhizomes. Eventually, it will form a dense thicket which prevents other plant species from germinating in that area. Due to its suppression of germination in the understory, Lonicera japonica also prevents the regeneration of trees.

Management of invasive Lonicera japonica has been achieved through a variety of means. Small patches can be removed by hand, or using simple digging tools, but all plant parts including roots and rhizomes must be removed to prevent resprouting. Larger patches can be removed through repeated mowing, but application of herbicide is also recommended to prevent regrowth. There has been some study of using controlled burns to remove Lonicera japonica, but the underground portion of the plant is usually able to survive and resprout, limiting the effectiveness of this method. Browsing by herbivores may limit its growth, but is unlikely to fully eliminate it. There is currently no known biological control for Lonicera japonica.

Chemistry
Lonicera japonica contains methyl caffeate, 3,4-di-O-caffeoylquinic acid, methyl 3,4-di-O-caffeoylquinate, protocatechuic acid, methyl chlorogenic acid, and luteolin. The two biflavonoids, 3′-O-methyl loniflavone and loniflavone, along with luteolin and chrysin, can be isolated from the leaves. Other phenolic compounds present in the plant are hyperoside, chlorogenic acid, and caffeic acid.  The two secoiridoid glycosides, loniceracetalides A and B, can be isolated, together with 10 known iridoid glycosides, from the flower buds.  The plant also contains the saponins loniceroside A and B and the antiinflammatory loniceroside C.

References

japonica
Flora of China
Flora of Eastern Asia
Medicinal plants of Asia
Dietary supplements
Plants used in traditional Chinese medicine
Garden plants of Asia
Drought-tolerant plants
Groundcovers
Vines
Introduced plants of South America
Plants described in 1784